Giorgi Tskhovrebadze (Georgian: გიორგი ცხოვრებაძე; born February 23, 1999) is a Georgian Entrepreneur and a computer programmer. He is a co-founder of RehabGlove, and currently operates as a chief executive officer. He is also co-creator of the popular videogame Wild Ones Remake.

Ecole polytechnique wrote a profile about Tskhovrebadze in their 2017 Annual Report

Early life 
Tskhovrebadze was introduced to computer programming in 2009, when he started studying at Information Technology Centre "Mziuri". After studying for 3 years, he continued learning programming languages like C#, ActionScript 3, on his own and started creating games and applications for mobile Bada OS before joining Stick Run team in 2012.
Tskhovrebadze graduated from Komarovi Physics and Mathematics High School in 2016 in Tbilisi, and enrolled at Ecole polytechnique Bachelor program in 2017.

Career

Video Games 
In 2012, Giorgi became one of the designers of popular Facebook game Stick Run, which now has over 50 million players. After leaving Stick Run Team in 2013, he stated creating games for Facebook Platform, one of the games being Fly and Smash, which had half a million players and over 400,000 likes on Facebook.

In 2016, Giorgi and Tunisian programmers Ahmed Selmi and Iyed Ben Hadj Dahmen, recreated a videogame Wild Ones Remake, which quickly caught attention of players. Wild Ones Remake has over a million players and is now listed in Facebook's Top Role-playing video games category.

RehabGlove 
Giorgi Tskhovrebadze is a chief executive officer at RehabGlove. Giorgi founded the startup with his brother, Dimitri Tskhovrebadze, in 2016. RehabGlove is a startup, which is creating exo-skeletons for stroke rehabilitation. After founding the company, RehabGlove has received multiple awards and recognition by companies like Microsoft and Seedstars. Microsoft has named RehabGlove "The Best Innovation in CEE & Central Asia regions" at Seedstars Regional Summit in Kyiv, Ukraine. Seedstars named RehabGlove as "Georgia's most promising startup".

In February, 2017, RehabGlove was presented at Mobile World Congress in Barcelona and got selected in top 10 startups.

In April, 2018, RehabGlove was presented at the Seedstars World Summit in Switzerland.

External links 
 Giorgi Tskhovrebadze on Facebook
 RehabGlove – Winner of Seedstars 2017 to Get a Chance to Win 1 Million USD . Caucasus Business Week.
 (Georgian)Victory of Georgian Startups. News.ge.

References

1999 births
Living people
Businesspeople from Georgia (country)